Ernestino Ramella (born 7 April 1955) is an Italian football manager and a former player who played as a striker.

References

External links
Ernestino Ramella at Footballdatabase

1955 births
Living people
Italian footballers
Association football forwards
Serie A players
Serie B players
Serie D players
Italian football managers
Querétaro F.C. managers
C.F. Pachuca managers
FC Chiasso managers
Flamurtari Vlorë managers
Kategoria Superiore managers
Italian expatriate football managers
Expatriate football managers in Mexico
Italian expatriate sportspeople in Mexico
Expatriate football managers in Switzerland
Italian expatriate sportspeople in Switzerland
Expatriate football managers in Albania
Italian expatriate sportspeople in Albania
Novara F.C. players
Ternana Calcio players
Piacenza Calcio 1919 players
A.C. Legnano players
Calcio Montebelluna players